The following list includes all of the Canadian Register of Historic Places listings in Cowichan Valley Regional District, British Columbia.

References 

(references appear in the table above as external links)

Cowichan Valley Regional District